Gravmark is a small village in Umeå Municipality, Sweden.

External links
Gravmark homepage

Populated places in Västerbotten County
Umeå